Mount Pellegrino is a hill facing east on the bay of Palermo, Sicily, southern Italy,  located north of the city.

It is 606 metres (1,970 ft) high with panorama views of the city, its surrounding mountains and the Tyrrhenian Sea. In his book Travels in Italy, Goethe described Monte Pellegrino as the most beautiful promontory in the world.

The mountain is home to the  Santuario di Santa Rosalia, venerating a patron saint of Palermo. Separate is a seashore facing belvedere  with a Statue of Santa Rosalia.

In addition, the paleolithic graffiti of the Grotta dell'Addaura were found on this mountain in 1943, but the site is no longer accessible.

From Palermo, is visible the pink Castello Utveggio on a lower promontory.

References

Pellegrino
Tourist attractions in Palermo